Once Upon a Forest is a 1993 animated musical adventure film produced by Hanna-Barbera Productions and distributed by 20th Century Fox. Based on the Furlings characters created by Rae Lambert, the film was directed by Charles Grosvenor and produced by David Kirschner, and stars the voices of Michael Crawford, Ellen Blain, Benji Gregory, Paige Gosney, Will Estes, Janet Waldo, Elisabeth Moss, and Ben Vereen.

The film is about three "Furlings" – the story's term for animal children – who go on an expedition to cure a friend that has been poisoned by chemical fumes. The film's environmental theme divided critics at the time of its release, along with the animation and story. The film grossed $6.6 million in the US against a budget of $13–16 million.

Plot 
In the forest of Dapplewood, four "Furlings" – Abigail, a wood mouse; Edgar, a mole; Russell, a hedgehog, and Michelle, a badger – live alongside their teacher and Michelle's uncle, Cornelius. One day, the Furlings go on a trip through the forest with Cornelius, where they see a road for the first time. Russell is almost run over by a Range Rover and a man at the passenger’s seat carelessly throws away a glass bottle that shatters in the middle of the road. Afterward, they go back to the forest to find that it has been destroyed by poison gas from an overturned tanker truck that blew a tire from the broken glass bottle. Michelle panics and runs to her home to find her parents, breathing in the gas and becoming severely ill. Abigail risks her own life and saves a comatose Michelle, but can do nothing for Michelle's parents. The Furlings go to Cornelius' house nearby for shelter after they find their homes deserted, believing everyone else to have succumbed to the gas. Cornelius tells the Furlings of his past encounter with humans that claimed the lives of his parents, hence why he is fearful of all human beings. He says he needs two herbs to make a potion that will save Michelle's life: lungwort and eyebright. With limited time, the Furlings head off for their journey the next day.

After facing numerous dangers, such as escaping a hungry barn owl, aiding a flock of religious wrens led by preacher Phineas, and encountering intimidating construction vehicles that the wrens call "Yellow Dragons", the Furlings make it to the meadow, where the herbs they need are. There, they meet the bully squirrel Waggs, and Willy, a tough but sensible mouse who grows a liking for Abigail. After getting the eyebright, they discover that the lungwort is on a giant cliff making it inaccessible by foot. Russell suggests they use Cornelius' airship, the Flapper-Wing-a-Ma-Thing, to get to the lungwort.

The Furlings manage to get the lungwort after a dangerous flight up the cliff, then steer their airship back for Dapplewood. They crash-land back in the forest after a storm, and bring the herbs to Michelle and Cornelius. A group of humans appear and the animals, thinking the humans mean them harm, escape through the backdoor of Cornelius' house. Edgar gets separated from the group and gets caught in an old trap. When one of the workers finds him, the animals are surprised when he frees Edgar and destroys the trap, revealing that the men are cleaning up the gas. The group, especially Cornelius, realize that there are good humans in the world.

Michelle is given the herbs. The next day, she appears unresponsive, but a single tear from Cornelius awakens her from her coma. Cornelius sees the Flapper-Wing-a-Ma-Thing and becomes amazed by how the Furlings have grown up. The Furlings' families and many of the other inhabitants arrive as well, except for Michelle's parents; Cornelius promises to do his best on taking good care of her. The Furlings happily reunite with their families, who are relieved to see that their children are alright. Michelle asks Cornelius if nothing will ever be the same again. Cornelius looks at the dead trees in the forest and says to her that if everyone works as hard to save Dapplewood as the Furlings did to save Michelle, it will be.

Cast 
 Michael Crawford as Cornelius, a badger who is Michelle's uncle and the teacher of the furlings. Crawford also acts as the film’s narrator.
 Ellen Blain as Abigail, a sweet, brave young wood mouse and the leader of the furlings.
 Florence Warner as Abigail as an Adult (segment "Once Upon A Time With Me") / The Balladeer (as Florence Warner Jones)
 Benji Gregory as Edgar, a young mole and the planner of the furlings.
 Paige Gosney as Russell, a young hedgehog and the doer of the furlings.
 Elisabeth Moss as Michelle, a young badger and Cornelius' maternal niece who becomes sick after inhaling poisonous gas.
 Ben Vereen as Phineas, a religious preacher bird.
 Will Estes as Willy, a young field mouse who becomes smitten by Abigail.
 Charlie Adler as Waggs, a wicked squirrel who bullies the furlings.
 Rickey D'Shon Collins as Bosworth, a young bird who was saved from a puddle of oil by the furlings.
 Don Reed as Marshbird
 Robert David Hall as Truck Driver, a man whose truck crashed and released the gas on Dapplewood.
 Paul Eiding as Abigail's father, an adult wood mouse
 Janet Waldo as Edgar's mother, an adult mole
 Susan Silo as Russell's mother, an adult hedgehog
 Angel Harper as Bosworth's mother, an adult bird
 Benjamin Kimball Smith as Russell's brother, a young hedgehog
 Haven Hartman as Russell's sister, a young hedgehog
 Frank Welker as the Barn owl (uncredited)

Production 
Once Upon a Forest was conceived as early as 1989, when the head of graphic design at ITV Cymru Wales, Rae Lambert, devised an environmental tale entitled A Furling's Story as a pitch to the American cartoon studio Hanna-Barbera (owned by Turner Broadcasting since 1991), along with partner Mike Young. Thanks to screenwriters Mark Young and Kelly Ward, the project started as a made-for-TV movie with The Endangered as its new name.

At the suggestion of Liz Kirschner, the wife of the film's producer, The Phantom of the Opera's Broadway star Michael Crawford was chosen to play Cornelius. Members of South Central Los Angeles' First Baptist Church were chosen to voice the chorus accompanying the preacher bird Phineas (voiced by Ben Vereen). While filming the live-action references, the crew "was thrilled beyond [...] expectations [as the chorus] started flipping their arms and moving their tambourines", recalls Kirschner.

William Hanna, co-founder and chairman of Hanna-Barbera was in charge of the film's production as its executive producer. "[It is] the finest feature production [we have] ever done," he told The Atlanta Journal-Constitution in May 1993. "When I stood up and presented it to the studio, my eyes teared up. It is very, very heartwarming."

Kirscher spoke to The Dallas Morning News Philip Wuntch a month later on the diversity of the film's production services: "Disney has great animators, and the studio has them locked up for years and years. We got the best worldwide animators available from Sweden [actually Denmark], Asia, Argentina, Spain and England [actually Canada]." Work on the animation was in the hands of Wang Film Productions in Taiwan; Lapiz Azul Animation and Matias Marcos Animation of Spain; the Jaime Diaz Studio of Argentina; Denmark's A. Film; Phoenix Animation Studios in Toronto, Canada; and The Hollywood Cartoon Company. Mark Swanson Productions did computer animation for the "Yellow Dragons" and the Flapper-Wing-a-Ma-Thing.

Because of time constraints and budget limitations, over ten minutes were cut from the film before its release. One of the deleted scenes featured the voice of Glenn Close, whose character was removed entirely from the final storyline. At around the same time, the studio temporarily changed the working title of The Endangered to the less-ominous Beyond the Yellow Dragons, for fear audiences would find the former title too sensitive for a children's film.

The film's advertising at the time promised a new masterpiece "from the creator of An American Tail". The creator in question was David Kirschner, who served as Tails executive producer, and actually did create the characters and the story of the film. But ReelViews James Berardinelli and the Times Union of Albany found it misleading, hoping instead for the likes of Don Bluth or Steven Spielberg.

Hanna-Barbera's feature production unit created to produce this film and Jetsons: The Movie (1990), which also carried an environmental theme, was spun off into another unit under parent company Turner Entertainment, Turner Feature Animation, which produced The Pagemaster and Cats Don't Dance. David Kirschner remained as head of the division. No further theatrical animated films were produced by Hanna-Barbera itself (it would license live-action film adaptations of The Flintstones and Scooby-Doo before being dissolved in 2001).

Release and reception 
The Miami Herald took note of the film's potential competition with Universal Studios' already-established summer hit, Jurassic Park: "[A] small but well-crafted animated feature like [this] seemingly doesn't stand a grasshopper's chance. And that's a shame, because this is a delightful family film." Ultimately, Once Upon a Forest did poorly in theaters: after opening with $2.2 million at 1,487 venues, it made $6.5 million at the North American box office, just over half its budget. The film holds  rating on Rotten Tomatoes based on  reviews. The critical consensus reads: "Inert animation and generically chipper characters rob Once Upon a Forest of any personality despite its well-intentioned message and critter appeal for very young children."

Fox Video's original VHS and laserdisc issue of the film, released on September 21, 1993, proved successful on the home video market for several months. On October 28, 2002, it premiered on DVD, also available on VHS in the UK with the content presented in fullscreen and widescreen formats. The original trailer was included as the only extra on the Australian Region 4 version.

Once Upon a Forest was nominated for an Annie Award for Best Animated Feature in 1993. It won an MPSE Golden Reel Award for Best Sound Editing.

Music 

The score for Once Upon a Forest was one of several that composer James Horner wrote for animated films of the late '80s and early '90s. Three songs were written for it: "Please Wake Up", "He's Gone/He's Back", and the closing credits track, "Once Upon a Time with Me". The songs were performed by the London Symphony Orchestra, with contributions from Ben Vereen and Michael Crawford. The soundtrack, released by Fox Records, has been out of print since its publisher went out of business in the mid-1990s.

Songs
Original songs performed in the film include:

Merchandise 
Once Upon a Forest was adapted into book form by Elizabeth Isele, with illustrations by Carol Holman Grosvenor, the film's production designer. The tie-in was issued by Turner Publishing and distributed by Andrews McMeel, a month prior to the film's release.

The multimedia company Sanctuary Woods also released a MS-DOS point-and-click adventure game based on the film, on CD-ROM and floppy disk for IBM computers; Beth Agnew served as its adapter. Many elements of the game stayed faithful to the original source material. None of the original voice actors reprised their roles as the voice acting was recorded in Canada.

See also 
 List of works produced by Hanna-Barbera Productions
 Lists of animated feature films
 List of American films of 1993
 FernGully: The Last Rainforest, another animated film released by Fox with an environmental theme

References

External links 

 
 
 
 

1990s American animated films
1990s children's animated films
1990s children's adventure films
1990s children's fantasy films
1990s musical drama films
1993 films
1993 drama films
1993 animated films
1993 directorial debut films
20th Century Fox animated films
20th Century Fox films
American animated films
American children's animated adventure films
American children's animated drama films
American children's animated fantasy films
American children's animated musical films
American fantasy adventure films
American musical drama films
Animated films about aviation
Animated films about mice
Animated films about squirrels
Animated films about orphans
British children's animated films
British children's adventure films
British animated fantasy films
British fantasy adventure films
Environmental films
Films about badgers
Fictional moles
Films about hedgehogs
Films about adoption
Films set in forests
Films directed by Charles Grosvenor
Films produced by David Kirschner
Films produced by William Hanna
Films scored by James Horner
Hanna-Barbera animated films
1990s English-language films
1990s British films